Michael Fenton (1789 – 6 April 1874) was a politician in colonial Tasmania. He was the first Speaker of the Tasmanian House of Assembly.

Biography
Michael Fenton was born in Castle Town, County Sligo, Ireland, the third son of Michael Fenton, who served as the high sheriff of Sligo.

Fenton was a captain in the 13th Light Infantry Regiment. After service in India and Burma, he sold his commission and emigrated to Tasmania (then Van Diemen's Land) in 1829, settling on a grant of land at Fenton Forest, near Glenora, on the River Derwent.

He was appointed a member of the nominee Tasmanian Legislative Council by Sir John Franklin in 1840, and was one of the "Patriotic Six" who resigned their seats in the Council in order to frustrate the financial policy of Governor John Eardley-Wilmot, in October 1845. However, he was reappointed by royal warrant in March 1847. In 1851 Fenton became one of the first elected members of the Legislative Council, representing New Norfolk. In 1855 he was elected Speaker in succession to Sir Richard Dry. When responsible government was conceded, he entered the House of Assembly for New Norfolk, and was elected the first Speaker in December 1856. Fenton continued to fill the chair of the House until retiring in May 1861. He was succeeded by Robert Officer.

Personal
In 1828 Fenton married Elizabeth Campbell, widow of Captain Neil Campbell, also of the 13th Light Infantry at Calcutta. Her father, Reverend John Russel Knox, was rector of Lifford and Inishmagrath, County Leitrim. They had six children; one son and three daughters survived Fenton, who died in New Norfolk on 6 April 1874 at the age of 85. Elizabeth wrote a journal titled A Narrative of Her Life in India, the Isle of France and Tasmania During the Years 1826–1830. Elizabeth died in 1875.

References

External links

1789 births
1874 deaths
Speakers of the Tasmanian House of Assembly
Members of the Tasmanian House of Assembly
Members of the Tasmanian Legislative Council
Irish emigrants to colonial Australia
Somerset Light Infantry officers
Politicians from County Sligo
Irish people of Australian descent
19th-century Australian politicians